was a Japanese writer of novels, short stories, poetry and essays, noted for his political consciousness. His most acclaimed works include Hiroba no kōdoku (lit. "Solitude in the Public Square", 1951), which was awarded the Akutagawa Prize, and Kage no bubun (Shadow Pieces, 1952). Hotta has also been associated with the Atomic bomb literature genre.

Biography
A graduate from Keio University, Hotta already published poems and essays in the literary journal Hihyō during his student years. He experienced the end of the Pacific War in Shanghai, where he stayed for two years to write for the Chinese Nationalist Party before returning to Japan in 1947. His early works centered on Japan's recent history, thematising events like the bombing of Hiroshima (in Kage no bubun, 1952, or Shimpan, 1963) or the Nanjing Massacre (in Jikan, 1955), and life in Japan during the early post-war years. Later, he turned his attention also to International relationships and history, attending meetings of the Afro-Asian Writers' Association and writing books about historic figures like Goya, Montaigne and François de La Rochefoucauld.

Selected works
 1951: Hiroba no kōdoku
 1952: Kage no bubun (Shadow Pieces)
 1952: Kankan
 1952: Rekishi
 1955: Jikan
 1957: Indo de kangaeta koto
 1963: Shimpan (Judgment)
 1971: Hōjōki shiki
 1974–77: Goya
 1991–94: Misheru jōkan no hito
 1998: Ra Roshufūkō kōshaku densetsu

Awards
 1951: Akutagawa Prize for Hiroba no kōdoku
 1971: Mainichi Publishing Culture Award for Hōjōki shiki
 1977: Jirō Osaragi Prize for Goya
 1994: Asahi Prize
 1998: Japan Art Academy Prize for Literature

Adaptations
Hiroba no kōdoku was adapted into a film in 1953, written by Katsuhito Inomata and directed by and starring Shin Saburi.

Together with Shin'ichirō Nakamura and Takehiko Fukunaga, Hotta wrote the original story which was later adapted into the kaiju film Mothra, first published in Asahi Shimbun.

Bibliography

References

1918 births
1998 deaths
20th-century Japanese novelists
Japanese historical novelists
People from Toyama Prefecture
Keio University alumni
Akutagawa Prize winners
20th-century Japanese male writers
Writers from Toyama Prefecture